Several special routes of U.S. Route 271 exist, including the following:


Texas

Pittsburg

Mount Pleasant

Bogata

Business U.S. Highway 271-D (Bus. It starts at US 271 in the center of Bogata, and goes through town, intersecting Texas State Highway 37 along the way. It then ends at US 271 outside of town. It is former Loop 38, of which the spur, Spur 38, still exists.

Major intersections

Deport

Paris

Business U.S. Highway 271-B (Bus. It runs through the downtown of Paris, Texas, which U.S. 271 bypasses. It starts at an interchange with US 271 and Loop 286. and heads towards downtown Paris, intersecting multiple city streets. Close to the center of town, the route turns north onto US 82-H (12th Street), forming a concurrency. It then turns west onto Lamar Ave and continues heading towards downtown Paris. In the center of town, the route turns north on Main Street and the concurrency ends. Before the route ends it intersects multiple city streets. The route ends at another interchange with US 271, US 82, and Loop 286.

Major intersections

Oklahoma

Hugo

U.S. 271 Business (Bus. It starts at an interchange with US 271 and U.S. Route 70, goes into Hugo, and then runs concurrently with U.S. Route 70 Business until they both end at an interchange with US 271, US 70, and the Indian Nation Turnpike.

Major intersections

References

71-2 Business
71-2
71-2